Sir John Edgar Galsworthy  (19 June 1919 – 18 May 1992) was a British diplomat, ambassador to Mexico 1972–1977, and counsellor to the UK delegation to the EEC. He was knighted KCVO in 1975 on the occasion of the Queen's state visit to Mexico.

He was educated at Emanuel School and Corpus Christi College, Cambridge, and served in World War II as an officer in the Duke of Cornwall's Light Infantry. His service number was 130051.

Galsworthy's brother, Sir Arthur Galsworthy KCVO, was the Governor of the Pitcairn Islands and High Commissioner to New Zealand from 1970 to 1973. In 1973, he was appointed Ambassador to the Republic of Ireland, where he served from 1973 to 1976. Arthur Galsworthy is the father of the diplomat Sir Anthony Galsworthy.

References
GALSWORTHY, Sir John (Edgar), Who Was Who, A & C Black, 1920–2015 (online edition, Oxford University Press, 2014)

External links
Convention on the Prevention of Marine Pollution

Knights Commander of the Royal Victorian Order
Companions of the Order of St Michael and St George
Ambassadors of the United Kingdom to Mexico
Duke of Cornwall's Light Infantry officers
British Army personnel of World War II
1919 births
1992 deaths
People educated at Emanuel School
Alumni of Corpus Christi College, Cambridge
British expatriates in New Zealand
British expatriates in Ireland